Armando Bianchi (born 20 November 1954) is an Italian former footballer who played as an attacking midfielder. He is a naturalized French citizen.

Career

In 1976, Bianchi signed for Paris Saint-Germain, one of France's most successful clubs, after playing for Rouen in the French second division.

At the age of 29, while playing for French second division side Racing Club de France, he suffered a career-shortening injury.

After football 
From 1985 to 1993, Bianchi was player-manager in Roanne and Riorges. He ended his playing days in 1993, and went to work for an insurance company for 12 years. In 2005, Bianchi returned to Roanne Foot, this time as both coach and technical director.

Personal life 
Bianchi arrived in France at the age of 5. He became a naturalized citizen at the age of 24.

References

External links

 

1954 births
Living people
Italian footballers
French sportspeople of Italian descent
Sportspeople from the Province of Como
Association football midfielders
FC Rouen players
Paris Saint-Germain F.C. players
Nîmes Olympique players
Paris FC players
Racing Club de France Football players
Grenoble Foot 38 players
Ligue 1 players
Ligue 2 players
Footballers from Lombardy